Transformers Autobots is an action-adventure video game based on the 2007 live action film Transformers. It is the Nintendo DS port of Transformers: The Game, but follows a different storyline and focuses exclusively on the Autobots. It was developed by Vicarious Visions alongside Transformers: Decepticons, which follows the Decepticons; the two games share some basic similarities, but overall feature different characters, missions and locations. Both games were published by Activision in June 2007, and received mixed reviews.

Gameplay
The game consists of four virtual locations, semi-destructible environments and enemies in the form of local law enforcement and opposing Transformers. "Hazard levels" denote the extent of attack the player character comes under based on how much destruction they perpetrate. Glowing spots on the map denote mission markers, which come in two varieties - twenty-three story missions, which further the game storyline, and thirty-four challenge missions, for players to test their skills. The game also features a slight RPG element in the form of XP, gained by destroying enemies and completing missions, which steadily increases players' levels (up to 20), unlocking new abilities and increasing stats. While a select number of missions allow players to take control of five of the Autobots or Decepticons featured in the movie, for the majority of the game, the player will control the "Create-A-Bot," a customizable generic Transformer whose alternate mode the player can determine by scanning any one of over thirty-five vehicles found throughout the game locations.(You can also name your Create-A-Bot.)

The games utilizes the Nintendo Wi-Fi Connection for the "AllSpark Wars" online campaign, which pits players of the two different versions of the game against each other. Players are able to download one new special single player challenge each day and earn points upon its completion. Their score is then uploaded to a server at the end of the challenge and the side with the most points at the end of the day (Autobots or Decepticons) wins the "battle". The first side to win seven battles wins the overall "war" and a new war begins. However, if the Autobots and Decepticons win at least one piece each, a "tiebreaker match" will be played until the whole Allspark is under control of either side. Players earn Wi-Fi tokens for their involvement, which will unlock additional vehicles and cheats for use while playing the main game. Despite the aforementioned Nintendo Wi-Fi Connection support, multiplayer death-matches are limited to localized wireless play. There is also a secret form for the custom character called "Skydive," which is countered by G1 Starscream, a somewhat improved Starscream, in the Decepticons game; both can be obtained by earning 2500 tokens through Wi-Fi play.

Synopsis

Characters
 Create-A-Bot (voiced by Steven Blum) - the player's own customizable character, portrayed as an Autobot rookie who seeks to prove himself to his superiors. 
 Optimus Prime (voiced by Peter Cullen) - the wise, heroic, and inspiring leader of the Autobots who transforms into a 1997 Peterbilt 379 semi-truck.
 Bumblebee - a recon officer and scout who transforms into a 1977 Chevrolet Camaro and communicates through the radio as his vocal processors were damaged by Megatron.
 Ironhide (voiced by Mark Ryan) - the Autobots' weapon specialist who first mentors the player when they arrive on Earth. He transforms into a GMC Topkick pickup truck.
 Jazz (voiced by Andrew Kishino) - the Autobots' second-in-command who transforms into a Pontiac Solstice GXP Weekend Racer Concept.
 Ratchet (voiced by Fred Tatasciore) - the Autobots' medical officer who transforms into a Search and Rescue Hummer H2. He is the only Autobot who the player doesn't have any personal interaction with throughout the game.

Plot
Upon landing on Earth, the Autobot rookie "Create-A-Bot" undergoes a basic systems check, under Ironhide's coordination, before defeating several Decepticons, including the Create-A-Bot from Transformers Decepticons, and taking on the form of a vehicle he scans.  Afterwards, he arrives in Tranquility, where Optimus Prime teaches him to value the lives of the humans that all Autobots are sworn to protect, before meeting with Bumblebee, who has him scan additional vehicles, as well as the internet for information on a pair of glasses with a Decepticon code imprinted onto them. After informing the Create-A-Bot that both the Decepticon leader Megatron and the AllSpark might be on Earth, Bumblebee leaves to retrieve the glasses, only to discover the Decepticon Barricade has already claimed them. Bumblebee pursues and ultimately defeats Barricade, before learning from a news article that a "giant metal man" was found frozen in the Arctic.

The Create-A-Bot goes there and meets with Ironhide, before discovering that a human military organization called Sector 7 found Megatron and had him imprisoned at their base there, but later moved him to an unknown location. They also discover an encrypted file titled "Project: Ice Man" which they send to Optimus, before being attacked by the Decepticon second-in-command Starscream, whom Ironhide defeats. Returning to Tranquility, the pair rendezvous with Bumblebee, who has discovered that Sector 7 had adapted Megatron's technology into automated defenses which they have set up all over town. Once Bumblebee destroys them, Optimus Prime arrives on Earth with Jazz and Ratchet, and sends Jazz to retrieve several Sector 7 vehicles for analysis, one of which turns out to be Decepticon Blackout. After driving him off, Jazz meets with Optimus and they learn through the data they've retrieved that Sector 7 has both Megatron and the AllSpark kept hidden inside the Hoover Dam. Vowing to destroy his former brother, Optimus orders Bumblebee to distract Sector 7's forces, allowing the other Autobots to escape, though when Create-A-Bot recklessly tries to help, Bumblebee gets himself captured while saving him.

When Optimus decides to focus on retrieving the AllSpark rather than saving Bumblebee, Ironhide angrily accuses him of caring only about destroying Megatron, though he later apologizes. At the Hoover Dam, Jazz hacks into Sector 7's computer systems and learns where Bumblebee is being kept, before Create-A-Bot is sent to rescue him. Bumblebee reveals that he knows where the AllSpark is, and retrieves it along with his weapon chip, before meeting with Optimus, though they are intercepted by Barricade when they try to leave the dam. Optimus battles and kills him, but with his final words, Barricade reveals he was merely a distraction, allowing the other Decepticons to free Megatron. Ironhide and the Create-A-Bot eavesdrop on the Decepticons and learn that they've placed bombs on the dam, which the former disarms, while Optimus goes after Megatron. He is intercepted by Brawl, but quickly dispatches of him.

The Autobots head back to Tranquility with the AllSpark, pursued by the Decepticons. Blackout goes after Bumblebee, but is killed by Ratchet. Megatron soon shows up and takes the AllSpark, wounding Bumblebee in the process. Optimus then attempts to take him on alone, but Megatron uses the AllSpark to create drones that attack him. The Create-A-Bot arrives and manages to get the AllSpark away from Megatron, shoving it into his chest, which mortally wounds him as well. Optimus proceeds to battle the injured Megatron, ultimately killing him and destroying the AllSpark. Before he dies, the Create-A-Bot tells Optimus to make Earth the Autobots' new home. Optimus mourns his death and later honors his last wish by sending a message into space for any surviving Autobots to join them on Earth before driving off into the sunset with Bumblebee, Ratchet, and Ironhide.

Reception

The game received "average" reviews, according to video game review aggregator Metacritic.

References

External links

 

2007 video games
Activision games
Multiplayer and single-player video games
Nintendo DS games
Nintendo DS-only games
Transformers (film series) video games
Vicarious Visions games
Video games based on adaptations
Video games based on films
Video games developed in the United States
Video games scored by Jason Graves
Video games scored by Rod Abernethy
Video games set in the United States